Towson Center is Towson University's 5,250-seat multi-purpose arena, in Towson, Maryland. The arena opened in 1976.

It was home to the Towson Tigers Men's and Women's basketball teams, the Volleyball team, and the Gymnastics team from 1976 to 2013.

On 16 October 1979 Towson Center hosted a concert by the rock'n'roll band AC/DC as part of its 'Highway to Hell' US tour with an attendance of 4,175.

In January 2011, it was formally announced that Towson Center would undergo a comprehensive renovation as part of the development of the new SECU Arena, which opened in 2013.  Under the new development, Towson Center's main arena was subdivided into a basketball practice facility, a gymnastics practice facility, offices for the Department of Athletics, a new Sports Performance facility featuring 10,000 square feet of space for both sports medicine and strength/conditioning plus a comprehensive academic/life skills center.

Fields close to Towson Center

Softball
The Softball Complex is located behind the arena. It is home to the Tigers’ Softball team. Seating is located behind home plate and along the first and third base lines which can accommodate over 200 spectators. The playing surface of the field is grass.

Tennis
The Tennis Complex is located behind the Towson Center. This facility has ten (five lighted for evening play) USTA regulation tennis courts which are home to the Men's and Women's Tennis teams. The men's tennis team was cut in 2006, leaving only the women's tennis team available. However, it later became a candidate for reinstatement.

Soccer
The Soccer Complex is located adjacent to the center. The stands are located along the sideline and have a capacity of 500 and the field is re-seeded and re-sodded every year. It serves as the home field for the Men's and Women's Soccer teams. A press box was added in Fall 2002, which is equipped with air conditioning and heating.

References
Towson Athletics - Towson Center
Towson Athletics - Softball Complex
Towson Athletics - Tennis Complex
Towson Athletics - Soccer Complex

Sports venues in Baltimore
College basketball venues in the United States
Basketball venues in Maryland
Towson Tigers sports venues
Towson Tigers men's basketball
Buildings and structures in Baltimore County, Maryland
1976 establishments in Maryland
Sports venues completed in 1976
Sports venues in the Baltimore metropolitan area